Gnorimoschema hoefneri is a moth in the family Gelechiidae. It was described by Rebel in 1909. It is found in the Alps in Austria, Italy and Slovenia.

The wingspan is 17-18.5 mm. The forewings are whitish-grey, strigulated with blackish-grey scales. The hindwings are grey.

References

Gnorimoschema
Moths described in 1909